Inda Zib'i is a reservoir located in the Inderta woreda of the Tigray Region in Ethiopia. The earthen dam that holds the reservoir was built in 1999 by SAERT.

Dam characteristics 
 Dam height: 12.34 metres
 Dam crest length: 227 metres
 Spillway width: 2 metres

Capacity 
 Original capacity: 182 593 m³
 Dead storage: 20 000 m³
 Reservoir area: 4.05 ha
In 2002, the life expectancy of the reservoir (the duration before it is filled with sediment) was estimated at 25 years.

Irrigation 
 Designed irrigated area: 13 ha
 Actual irrigated area in 2002: 0 ha

Environment 
The catchment of the reservoir is 1.49 km² large, with a perimeter of 4.77 km and a length of 1320 metres. The reservoir suffers from rapid siltation. The lithology of the catchment is Agula Shale. Part of the water that could be used for irrigation is lost through seepage; the positive side-effect is that this contributes to groundwater recharge.

References 

Reservoirs in Ethiopia
1999 establishments in Ethiopia
Tigray Region